Brandon D. Wales is an American national security official who served as the acting director of the Cybersecurity and Infrastructure Security Agency. Wales assumed office after President Donald Trump fired Chris Krebs, and previously served as first executive director of the agency.

Education 
Wales earned a bachelor's degree from George Washington University and a Master of Arts degree from Paul H. Nitze School of Advanced International Studies at Johns Hopkins University.

Career 
After serving as a national security advisor to Arizona Senator Jon Kyl, he joined the United States Department of Homeland Security in 2005, managing the Homeland Infrastructure Threat and Risk Analysis Center. From August 2017 to January 2019, he served as a senior counselor to then-Secretary Kirstjen Nielsen.

References 

Living people
United States Department of Homeland Security officials
Year of birth missing (living people)
George Washington University alumni
Paul H. Nitze School of Advanced International Studies alumni
Trump administration personnel